The 2015–16 season is the fifth season of the SEHA (South East Handball Association) League and second under the sponsorship of the Russian oil and gas company Gazprom. Ten teams from seven countries (Bosnia and Herzegovina, Croatia, Macedonia, Hungary, Slovakia, Serbia and Belarus) will participate in this year's competition.

Veszprém are the defending champions. The SEHA League consists of two phases – the first has 18 rounds in which all teams play one home and one away game against each other. After that the four best ranked clubs play the Final Four. The campaign began on 1 September 2015 with the match between the defending champions Veszprém and last year's runner-up Meshkov Brest. The regular season will end on 13 March 2016, while the Final Four tournament will be held in Varaždin from 1 to 3 April 2016.

Team information

Venues and locations

Regular season

Standings

Results 
In the table below the home teams are listed on the left and the away teams along the top.

Final four
The final four was held at the Varaždin Arena, in Varaždin, Croatia on 1 and 3 April 2016.

Format
The first-placed team of the group faces the fourth-placed team, and the second-placed team will play against the third-placed team from the other group in the final four.

Semifinals

Match for third place

Final

References

External links 
 

SEHA League
2015–16 domestic handball leagues